Polycladomyces is a bacterial genus from the family of Thermoactinomycetaceae. Up to now there is only one species of this genus known (Polycladomyces abyssicola).

References

Further reading 
 

Bacillales
Bacteria genera
Monotypic bacteria genera